Lõunakeskus ('Southern Center') is a shopping and entertainment complex in Tartu, Estonia. It is the biggest shopping center in South Estonia. More than 170 shops and service providers operate in Lõunakeskus. The area of the center is 90,300 square meters, the center is visited annually by more than 5 million people.

The owner of the center is Astri Group.

The center was opened in 2001.

The center consists of eg a year-round ice arena (see #Astri Arena), Apollo Cinema, Sophia Hotel, adventure park.

Astri Arena

Astri Arena (also Lõunakeskus Ice Hall) is an ice arena, which capacity is 600. The arena is the home arena for the ice hockey club Tartu Kalev-Välk.

References

External links

 

2001 establishments in Estonia
Buildings and structures in Tartu
Shopping centres in Estonia
Shopping malls established in 2001
Tourist attractions in Tartu